Julie Van Gelder (born 17 September 1993) is a Belgian female acrobatic gymnast. With partners Ineke Van Schoor and Kaat Dumarey, Van Gelder achieved bronze in the 2014 Acrobatic Gymnastics World Championships.

In June 2015, she participated in the first European Games along with partners Ineke van Schoor and Kaat Dumarey, and won the gold medal in the all-around event, with a score of 86.480. They also posted the highest score on their balance and dynamic routines, with a 28.700 and a 28.450, respectively.

References

External links

 
 

1993 births
Living people
Belgian acrobatic gymnasts
Female acrobatic gymnasts
Gymnasts at the 2015 European Games
European Games medalists in gymnastics
European Games gold medalists for Belgium
Medalists at the Acrobatic Gymnastics World Championships
Competitors at the 2009 World Games
World Games silver medalists